Neuhauser is a German surname. Notable people with this surname include:
 Adele Neuhauser (born 1959), Greek-born Austrian actress
 Claudia Neuhauser (born 1962), American mathematical biologist
 Frank Neuhauser (1913–2011), American patent lawyer and spelling bee champion
 Georg Neuhauser (born 1982), Austrian metal vocalist
 Leopold Neuhauser (died after 1813), Austrian musician and composer
 Mary Neuhauser (born 1934), American lawyer and politician

Other uses
 13980 Neuhauser (1992 NS), a main-belt asteroid discovered in 1992
 Neuhauser Straße, a road in Munich, Germany

See also
 Don Newhauser (born 1947), American former professional baseball player
 Neuhaus (disambiguation)
 Neuhausen (disambiguation)
 Neuhäusel (disambiguation)